WMFD-TV, virtual channel 68 (VHF digital channel 12), is an independent television station licensed to Mansfield, Ohio, United States. Owned by Mid-State Television, Inc. (headed by Robert Meisse), it is sister to radio stations WVNO-FM (106.1) and WRGM (1440 AM and translator 106.7 FM). The stations share studios on Park Avenue West in Ontario, Ohio (with a Mansfield mailing address), where WMFD-TV's transmitter is also located. WMFD-TV is available on digital cable systems in the North-Central Ohio area and on DirecTV and Dish Network throughout the Cleveland market.

History

The station first signed on the air on January 10, 1986 as WCEO-TV, originally broadcasting on UHF channel 68. It changed its call letters to WCOM on July 24, 1987. The station attempted to enter the Columbus market by construction with a tall transmitter tower (the tallest ever erected in Ohio) south of Mansfield in Butler, but it never achieved cable carriage in the market and shut down in 1989.

Channel 68 returned to the air under the current WMFD-TV call letters on June 1, 1992; this time, targeting viewers in north-central Ohio (the WMFD-TV callsign was previously used on what is now WECT in Wilmington, North Carolina from that station's sign-on in 1954 until 1958).

Low-power station WOHZ-CD was co-owned with WMFD until Mid-State Television sold the station to Gray Television in 2020.

Programming
As the only television station serving the North Central Ohio area, WMFD concentrates on local programming such as Bon Appetit: The Dining Show and Focus on North Central Ohio. The station produces local newscasts, branded as NewsWatch HD, which air weekdays at 6 a.m. and noon for a half-hour, and for an hour each weeknight at 5, 6, 10 and 11 p.m. Outside of local programs, the station fills out the remainder of its schedule with syndicated programming (with an emphasis on agriculture programs) and infomercials. Syndicated programs broadcast on WMFD include Access Hollywood, Laura McKenzie's Traveler, In Ohio Country Today, AgDay, U.S. Farm Report and On the Money.

Technical information

Subchannels
The station's digital signal is multiplexed:

Analog-to-digital conversion
WMFD-TV signed on its digital signal on VHF channel 12 in 1998, claiming to be the first independent station in the United States to begin digital television broadcasts. The station shut down its analog signal, over UHF channel 68, on June 16, 2008.. The station's digital signal continued to broadcasts on its pre-transition VHF channel 12. Through the use of PSIP, digital television receivers display the station's virtual channel as its former UHF analog channel 68, which was among the high band UHF channels (52-69) that were removed from broadcasting use as a result of the transition.

References

External links 
Official website

Television channels and stations established in 1986
1986 establishments in Ohio
MFD-TV
Independent television stations in the United States
TheGrio affiliates
Mansfield, Ohio